The People of Högbogården (Swedish: Folket på Högbogården) is a 1939 Swedish drama film directed by Arne Weel and starring John Ekman, Linnéa Hillberg and Annalisa Ericson. Location shooting took place around Gränna. It is based on a 1907 play by Danish writer Jeppe Aakjær, which Weel had directed as a Danish film Life on the Hegn Farm in 1938.

Cast
 John Ekman as Ola Berg
 Linnéa Hillberg as 	Mrs. Karin Berg
 Annalisa Ericson as 	Greta Berg
 Bodil Kåge as 	Young Greta
 Peter Höglund as 	Arne Andersson
 Ragnar Planthaber as 	Young Arne
 Carl Ström as 	Per Sjövall
 Hilda Borgström as Per's Wife
 Wiktor Andersson as 	Farm-hand
 Carl Browallius as 	Old poor man
 Ivar Kåge as Nelson
 Oscar Ljung as 	Preacher
 John Melin as Mats Wilhelmsson
 Tekla Sjöblom as 	Old Woman
 Birgitta Valberg as 	Young Woman

References

Bibliography 
 Qvist, Per Olov & von Bagh, Peter. Guide to the Cinema of Sweden and Finland. Greenwood Publishing Group, 2000.

External links 
 

1939 films
Swedish drama films
1939 drama films
1930s Swedish-language films
Films directed by Arne Weel
Swedish films based on plays
Remakes of Danish films
1930s Swedish films